The Israeli Documentary Filmmakers Forum is an Israeli Nonprofit organization foster documentary films and series.
The Israeli Documentary Filmmakers Forum include over 450 members.
In 2006 the forum initiated and organized an annual competition, called  "The Israeli Documentary Film Competition".
The forum held a long-standing struggle to invest more money and get more broadcast time for original Israeli documentary projects in the Israeli television channels.

The current forum's chairwoman is Hagit Ben Yakov. Her predecessors were Osnat Trabelsi, Uri Rosenwaks,
Avishai Kfir and Naftali Glicksberg.

References

External links
 The Israeli Documentary Filmmakers Forum site

Film organizations in Israel